Persatuan Sepakbola Indonesia Sukoharjo (simply known as Persiharjo) is an Indonesian football club based in Sukoharjo Regency, Central Java. They compete in Liga 3.

Players

Current squad

Coaching staff

References

External links

Football clubs in Indonesia
Football clubs in Central Java
Association football clubs established in 1972
1972 establishments in Indonesia